The 1969 Alaşehir earthquake occurred on March 28, at 03:48 local time near the city of Alaşehir in Turkey's Manisa Province. The 6.6  earthquake struck at a depth of 1.9 km. It had a MSK 64 intensity of VIII (Destructive). At least 53 people were killed in the earthquake.

Tectonic setting
The Alaşehir region is dominated by extensional faulting in the young sedimentary layers. Extension accommodated by normal faults cause uplift in the land, forming graben features. Earthquakes in this region have pure normal dip-slip mechanism with no strike-slip components. These earthquakes occur along faults that are parallel to the grabens. Faults in the area have a dip angle of 30–60° and are up to 12 km beneath the surface.

Earthquake
The earthquake occurred in the Alaşehir Valley where normal faulting was the mechanism; occurring along a northwest–southeast striking, northeast dipping plane. Surface ruptures developed in the valley where the quake struck. At least six surface ruptures were traced uninterrupted for long distances. The longest rupture was measured at more than 12 km in length. The total length of measured surface rupture was 30–36 km, extending from Dereköy, through Alaşehir and terminating at Doğuşlar. An average surface offset of 20 cm was measures, although this was taken a week after the quake hence aseismic creep may have occurred and affected actual coseismic offset measurements.

An intense aftershock sequence followed the mainshock. One of the aftershocks was recorded as  4.6. Felt report of aftershocks by locals have been debunked as separate seismic activity in Demirci, where another severe earthquake occurred on March 23.

Impact
Land failure and landslides on the slopes of the valleys contributed to heavy damage. Many small villages suffered great destruction. At least 3,072 buildings were damaged or destroyed. The Demirköprü Dam however, was undamaged. A total of 53 people died.

See also
 List of earthquakes in 1969
 List of earthquakes in Turkey

References

External links

Earthquakes in Turkey
Alaşehir
Alaşehir Earthquake
Alaşehir 
1969 Earthquake
Geography of Manisa Province
History of Manisa Province
1969 disasters in Turkey